WASP-5b is an extrasolar planet orbiting the star WASP-5 located approximately 1000 light-years away in the constellation Phoenix. The planet's mass and radius indicate that it is a gas giant with a similar bulk composition to Jupiter. The small orbital distance of WASP-5 b around its star mean it belongs to a class of planets known as hot Jupiters. The equilibrium planetary temperature would be 1717 K, but measured in 2015 temperature was still much higher at 2500 K. Dayside temperature measured in 2020 was 2000 K.

The study in 2012, utilizing a Rossiter–McLaughlin effect, have determined the planetary orbit is probably aligned with the equatorial plane of the star, misalignment equal to 12.1°.

See also
 SuperWASP
 WASP-4b
 WASP-3b

References

External links

 UK planet hunters announce three new finds
 SuperWASP Homepage

Exoplanets discovered by WASP
Exoplanets discovered in 2007
Giant planets
Hot Jupiters
Transiting exoplanets
Phoenix (constellation)

de:WASP-5 b